The 1989 Pontypridd by-election was a by-election held in Wales on 23 February 1989 for the House of Commons constituency of Pontypridd in Mid Glamorgan.

The by-election was caused by the death of the constituency's Labour Party Member of Parliament (MP) Brynmor John on 13 December 1988.

The result was a Labour Party hold, with Dr Kim Howells winning a majority of almost 11,000 votes.

Whilst out canvassing for the Conservative party, neighbouring MP Sir Raymond Gower died, which resulted in the Vale of Glamorgan by-election.

Result

References 

 House of Commons Paper on By Elections in the 1987-1992 Parliament

See also
 List of United Kingdom by-elections
 Pontypridd constituency

By-elections to the Parliament of the United Kingdom in Welsh constituencies
Pontypridd by-election
1980s elections in Wales
Pontypridd by-election
Pontypridd by-election
Pontypridd
Mid Glamorgan